Penzliner Land is an Amt in the Mecklenburgische Seenplatte district, Germany. The seat of the Amt is in Penzlin. Aver See is a small lake within the Amt.

Municipalities
 Ankershagen
 Kuckssee
 Möllenhagen
 Penzlin

Ämter in Mecklenburg-Western Pomerania
Mecklenburgische Seenplatte (district)